John Yardley may refer to:
 John F. Yardley (1925–2001), American engineer
 John H. Yardley (c. 1926–2011), American pathologist